Parmacella valenciennii is a species of air-breathing land slug, a terrestrial pulmonate gastropod mollusk in the family Parmacellidae.

Distribution 
The distribution of Parmacella valenciennii includes:
 Southern Portugal (south of Lisboa), It is very abundant in Alentejo.
 Spain
 Isolated area(s) in southern France

Description 
The animal is brownish red to brownish olive, with black bands on the mantle. Adult specimens are lighter. The body is sharply keeled in the posterior section. The mantle length in young animals is about 3/4 of the body length. The mantle is rounded in the anterior part and pointed in posterior part. The animal is up to 100 mm long, usually 70–80 mm long and 20 mm in width.

The shell is yellow, triangular, fragile and flat, with 1.5 whorls. The length of the shell is 15 mm, 9 mm in width and 2–3 mm high.

Parmacella valenciennii differs anatomically from all other Parmacella species by a single, characteristically horn-shaped and almost straight accessory atrial appendix.

Ecology 
Parmacella valenciennii lives in stony open habitats, preferring shady and humid sites between plants and stones. The animals move slowly.

There is a high abundance of these animals in the spring; the animals were so abundant that they were formerly used as pig food in southern Portugal.

References
This article incorporates public domain text from the reference.

Parmacellidae
Gastropods described in 1836